The Aylesford Press was a book publishing company based in Upton, Cheshire, England.

References 

Book publishing companies of England
Companies based in Chester